Round Spinney is a locality in the north-east of the English town of Northampton.

Round Spinney is located east of the main A43 road which runs from Northampton to Kettering. It gives its name to an Industrial Estate and the nearby roundabout.

The population at the 2011 Census was included in the Talavera ward of Northampton Council.

External links 

Areas of Northampton